Yusufkhan Mohamadkhan Pathan is an authority on Maratha saints. He was born on 1 March 1930. He has been head of department, Marathwada University, Aurangabad, Maharashtra, India
In 2007, he received a Padma Shri award from the Government of India for excellence in literature and education. O'Hanlon cites his as the editor of Bhausahebanchi bakhar, Deshpande cites him as the editor of the Sabhasad Bakhar. In 2004 he received the Indian Independence day Certificate of honour for Persian language.

References

Pathan, Yusufkhan Mohamadkhan
People from Aurangabad, Maharashtra
1930 births
Living people
Recipients of the Padma Shri in literature & education
People from Marathwada
Presidents of the Akhil Bharatiya Marathi Sahitya Sammelan